Holcosus is a genus of lizards in the family Teiidae.

Geographic range
Species of the genus Holcosus are found in southern Mexico, Central America, and northern South America.

Species
These 18 species are recognized as being valid. Binomial authority in parentheses indicates that the species was originally described in a genus other than Holcosus.

References

 
Lizard genera